Sound + Vision is the first box set by English musician David Bowie, released by Rykodisc in 1989. By the end of the 1980s, the rights to Bowie's pre-1983 catalogue (originally issued by Phillips/Mercury Records and RCA Records) reverted to Bowie and his former management company, MainMan. Rykodisc had approached Bowie in 1988 to re-release his albums on CD and Bowie agreed, and in September 1989 the Sound + Vision box set was released. By April 1990, the box set had sold over 200,000 copies, which, for a set costing $50–$60 (or about $ today), was considered "phenomenal".

Set contents
Sound + Vision was originally conceived in January 1988 as a career retrospective, modeled on Bob Dylan's Biograph and Eric Clapton's Crossroads, that launched the then-upcoming Rykodisc CD reissue campaign covering Bowie's output from 1969 to 1980. Primarily based on the Serious Moonlight Tour setlist, it contains few of Bowie's greatest hits in their original form, instead frequently opting for demos, live versions and even a German vocal version of ""Heroes"" ("Helden"). The "rarities" originally included on the 1989 edition of Sound + Vision—rare single versions of "Wild Eyed Boy from Freecloud" and "Rebel Rebel", and previously unreleased studio outtakes "London Bye Ta-Ta", "1984/Dodo", "After Today" and "It's Hard to Be a Saint in the City"—were exclusive to this box set.

Awards and reception
The set won the 1990 Grammy Award for Best Album Package. Rolling Stone said the boxset "stood above the rest [of the 1989 boxset releases]" and called the release a "promising harbinger" for the then-upcoming re-release of Bowie's RCA back catalogue on CD by Rykodisc, for which Bowie launched a worldwide supporting tour.

Release versions
It exists in two primary editions, each of which has been released in an original version and a subsequent repackaged version:
 
 The original 1989 Rykodisc edition, in an LP-size box designed by Roger Gorman and featuring photography by Greg Gorman, was either in LP, audiocassette or CD format, as six LPs, three cassettes or three CDs and one CD-Video (a Laserdisc type disc that was retired in 1991), with the latter containing three audio live tracks and the music video of "Ashes to Ashes". There was also a numbered limited edition of 350 in a solid beech wood case with a certificate personally signed by Bowie. Content from this release included material from Bowie's catalogue through 1980 (including several live performances from the 1970s). A second Rykodisc version of this edition, released in 1994 on CD, replaced the CD-Video with a regular CD-ROM, and a further reissue in 1995 omitted the video disc entirely and was packaged in a smaller slipcase. The contents of these releases are otherwise identical to the original release.
 A new edition of the album, issued by Virgin/EMI in 2003, added Bowie studio material released from 1982–1993 (plus live tracks from 1983 and 1997), and replaced some of the tracks from the original set with alternate versions. This version contains more tracks on each CD than the original release, and does not include the CD-Video/CD-ROM tracks from the original release. This edition was re-released on CD, in a smaller slipcase, under the Rhino imprint in 2014.

Track listing

1989 issue

2003 reissue (CD: EMI / 5945112)
All songs written by David Bowie except where noted. Songs that are different from the original Sound + Vision box set or new to this release of the box set are as indicated with *.

Charts
Album

Certifications

References

Albums produced by David Bowie
Albums produced by Ken Scott
Albums produced by Tony Visconti
Albums produced by Hugh Padgham
David Bowie compilation albums
David Bowie video albums
1989 compilation albums
1989 video albums
1989 live albums
Live video albums
EMI Records compilation albums
Rykodisc compilation albums
Virgin Records compilation albums
EMI Records live albums
Rykodisc live albums
Virgin Records live albums
EMI Records video albums
Rykodisc video albums
Virgin Records video albums